ProgPower is the name of four progressive and power metal festivals:

ProgPower Europe (formerly called ProgPower), held in the Netherlands since 1999
ProgPower USA, held in the United States since 2001
ProgPower UK, held in the United Kingdom in 2006 and 2007
ProgPower Scandinavia, held in Denmark in 2007 and 2008